Patriarchate of Jerusalem may refer to:
 Early bishops of Jerusalem until the Council of Chalcedon in 451
 Latin Patriarchate of Jerusalem, (Catholic Church)
 Greek Orthodox Patriarchate of Jerusalem, (Eastern Orthodox Church)
 Greek Orthodox Patriarch of Jerusalem
 Armenian Patriarchate of Jerusalem (Armenian Apostolic Church)
 List of Armenian patriarchs of Jerusalem

Bishop, Diocese, Archbishop, Archdiocese, Exarch, or Exarchate of Jerusalem may refer to the above-listed patriarchates or to:
 Melkite Greek Catholic Patriarchal Dependent Territory of Jerusalem (Melkite Greek Catholic Church)
 Armenian Catholic Patriarchal Exarchate of Jerusalem and Amman (Armenian Catholic Church)
 Syriac Catholic Patriarchal Exarchate of Jerusalem (Syriac Catholic Church)
 Maronite Catholic Patriarchal Exarchate of Jerusalem and Palestine (Maronite Church)
 Syriac Orthodox Archbishop of Jerusalem (Syriac Orthodox Church)
 Coptic Orthodox Archdiocese of Jerusalem (Coptic Orthodox Church)
 Anglican Diocese of Jerusalem (Anglican Communion)

See also 
 Jerusalem in Christianity
 Dioceses of the Church of the East to 1318, including Jerusalem
 Pentarchy
 Patriarchate of Antioch (disambiguation)
 Patriarchate of Alexandria (disambiguation)
 Patriarchate of Constantinople (disambiguation)
 History of Early Christianity

Patriarchs of Jerusalem